In Norse cosmology, Niflheim or Niflheimr ("World of Mist", literally "Home of Mist") is a location which sometimes overlaps with the notions of Niflhel and Hel. The name Niflheimr appears only in two extant sources: Gylfaginning and the much-debated Hrafnagaldr Óðins.

Niflheim was primarily a realm of primordial ice and cold, with the frozen rivers of Élivágar and the well of Hvergelmir, from which come all the rivers.

According to Gylfaginning, Niflheim was the second of the two primordial realms to emanate out of Ginnungagap, the other one being Muspelheim, the realm of fire. Between these two realms of cold and heat, creation began when its waters mixed with the heat of Muspelheim to form a "creating steam". Later, it became the abode of Hel, a goddess daughter of Loki, and the afterlife for her subjects, those who did not die a heroic or notable death.

Etymology
Nifl ("mist"; whence the Icelandic nifl) is a cognate to the Old English nifol ("dark, gloomy"), (Middle) Dutch nevel, Old High German nebul ("fog")  and Ancient Greek νεφέλη, ("cloud").

Gylfaginning
In Gylfaginning by Snorri Sturluson, Gylfi, the king of ancient Scandinavia, receives an education in Norse mythology from Odin in the guise of three men. Gylfi learns from Odin (as Jafnhárr) that Niflheimr was the first world to be created after Muspelheim:

Odin (as Þriði) further tells Gylfi that it was when the ice from Niflheimr met the flames from Muspelheimr that creation began and Ymir was formed:

In relation to the world tree Yggdrasill, Jafnhárr (Odin) tells Gylfi that frost jötnar is located under the second root, where Ginnungagap (Yawning Void) once was:

Gylfi is furthermore informed that when Loki had engendered Hel, she was cast into Niflheimr by Odin:

Hel thus became the mistress of the world of those dead in disease and old age. This is the only instance in which Niflheim and Hel are equated (the Poetic Edda mentions Hel but doesn't say anything about Niflheim).
However, there is some confusion in the different versions of the manuscript, with some of them saying Niflheim where others say Niflhel (the lowest level of Hel). Thus in the passage about the last destination of the jötunn who was killed by Thor after he had built Asgard:

Hrafnagaldr Óðins
In Hrafnagaldr Óðins, there is a brief mention of Niflheimr as a location in the North, towards which the sun (Alfr's illuminator) chased the night as it rose:

See also
 Æsir
 Aurgelmir
 Ginnungagap
 Gjöll
 Hel
 Hvergelmir
 Níðhöggr
 Niflhel
 Rime-Giants
 List of Germanic deities

Notes and references

Locations in Norse mythology
Norse underworld
Ymir